Yanagi (柳) ("willow") can refer to: 

 Yanagi (surname), a Japanese surname 
 Yanagi missions, a series of long-distance submarine voyages during the Second World War
 Yanagi Station, a railway station of Japan's Suzuka Line
 Yanagi ba, a long thin knife used in Japanese cuisine
 Salix koriyanagi, a species of willow used for making baskets and furniture
 Japanese destroyer Yanagi